Prayer for Cleansing was an American metalcore band from Raleigh, North Carolina. The band is noted for their extreme metal (death/black metal) influence that was a little more prominent in their music than other metalcore bands at the time. They are also notable for being an early musical starting point for three members of Between the Buried and Me (Paul Waggoner, Will Goodyear and Tommy Giles Rogers) who played in the band.

Biography 
The band, consisting of David Anthem (vocals), Paul Waggoner (guitar), Dennis Lamb (guitar), Will Goodyear (drums) and Marc Duncan (bass) formed in 1996, going through numerous member changes up until 1997.  In 1999 they signed to Tribunal Records, releasing their first and by far most popular album, Rain in Endless Fall. Shortly before the album was released, Dennis Lamb left the band, being replaced by James Chang of Undying, and later Tommy Rogers.  In 2000 the band broke up after an automobile accident which totaled their new touring van. The band performed two reunion shows, the first being on March 13, 2004, at the Tremont Music Hall in Charlotte, North Carolina in front of nearly one thousand fans from as far away as Mexico.  The second show was at the 2004 Hellfest music festival, held in Elizabeth, New Jersey.

Prayer for Cleansing's music continued to grab attention however. 2003 saw a re-mixed and re-mastered version of The Rain in Endless Fall released on Tribunal Records, including new artwork. In 2004, Prayer for Cleansing's second album, The Tragedy, was released as a joint label CD/7" by Southern Empire Records, Surprise Attack Records and War Torn Records. The Tragedy featured re-recordings of three songs previously unavailable on an official release (though all three had been widely available in mp3 form), including their popular cover of The Cranberries song "Salvation".  In 2004, straight edge distributor Seventh Dagger Records released The Rain in Endless Fall on vinyl. The band remains inactive since then. Lead guitarist Paul Waggoner later said in a 2009 interview: "I guess that band had sorta run its course. Some of the guys were in school and we didn't really see it going anywhere.  At the same time we also wanted to start something different and try to push ourselves a little more musically. I wouldn't say we were bored with what we were doing, but that was around the time when metalcore was starting to sorta take off and bands were kinda coming out of the woodwork. We no longer felt like we were doing something different or creative."

Later projects 
Tommy Rogers, Paul Waggoner, Marc Duncan and Will Goodyear went on to play in the Raleigh, North Carolina progressive metal band Between the Buried and Me (Marc Duncan left before the band recorded anything and Will Goodyear left after their first album).  Tommy Rogers and Paul Waggoner were both members of Undying, playing drums and guitar, respectively. Tommy Rogers was also the singer for Tribunal Records label mates From Here On. Dennis Lamb went on to play guitar for Azazel, also a Tribunal Records band (with future Between the Buried and Me members Jason King and Nick Fletcher) and has recorded with the Austrian band Der Blutharsch. David Anthem now runs a vegan coffee shop in Philadelphia, The Grindcore House.

Reunion show 
The band has announced they are playing a one-off benefit show featuring their Rain in Endless Fall lineup on December 18, 2022 in memory of John Rivera and to benefit his family. One of the other bands reforming for the concert is Undying, one of ex-rhythm guitarists James Chang and Tommy Rogers' former bands. The band will also have a remaster of the original mix of their album reissued on vinyl by To Live A Lie Records in late 2022/early 2023.

Members

Current lineup 
Will Goodyear – drums, keyboards, additional clean vocals (1997–2000, 2003–2004, 2022)
Paul Waggoner – lead guitar (1997–2000, 2003–2004, 2022)
Dave Anthem – vocals (1997–2000, 2003–2004, 2022)
Dennis Lamb – rhythm guitar (1997–1999, 2022)
Marc Duncan – bass guitar (1997–2000, 2022)

Previous members 
Tommy Rogers – rhythm guitar (1999–2000, 2003–2004)
Jimmy Chang – rhythm guitar (1999), bass guitar (2003–2004)

Timeline

Discography

Rain in Endless Fall

Track listing

Personnel 

Prayer for Cleansing
 David Anthem – vocals
 Paul Waggoner – guitars
 Dennis Lamb – guitars
 Mark Duncan – bass
 Will Goodyear – drums, piano, clean vocals on "Feinbhas a Ghabhail"

Additional personnel
 Lenny Watts – backing vocals (tracks 2 and 4)
 Ian Schreier – recording, mixing
 Jamie King – digital editing, mixing (2003 remix/remaster)
 Abbadon Graphicworks – layout and design (CD)
 Jacob Bigham – layout and design (2003 remaster CD)
 Justin Pope – layout and design (vinyl)
 Matthew H. Rudzinski – production, mixing (2003 remix/remaster)

The Tragedy (EP)

Track listing

Personnel 

Prayer for Cleansing
 David Anthem – vocals
 Paul Waggoner – guitars
 Thomas Rogers – guitars
 James Chang – bass
 Will Goodyear – drums, clean vocals on "Salvation"

Additional personnel
 Jamie King – recording, mixing

References

External links 
Tribunal Records
War Torn Records
Seventh Dagger Records

Metalcore musical groups from North Carolina
Heavy metal musical groups from North Carolina
Straight edge groups
Musical groups established in 1996
Musical groups disestablished in 2000
Musical groups from Raleigh, North Carolina